Mose is a masculine given name. Mose or MOSE may also refer to:


Surname
 Carl C. Mose (1903–1973), American sculptor and art teacher
 Charonne Mose, Canadian choreographer, creative director and dancer
 Erik Møse (born 1950), Norwegian judge on the Supreme Court of Norway
 Robert Mose, English Member of Parliament
 Viviane Mosé (born 1964), Brazilian poet, philosopher, psychologist, psychoanalyst and public policy consultant

Places
 Moše, Slovenia, a village
 Mose, North Dakota, a community in the United States
 Fort Mose, Florida, United States – see Fort Mose Historic State Park

Other uses
 MOSE, an infrastructure project designed to protect Venice from flooding
 Hirth Hi 20 MoSe, a German late 1930s motor glider

See also
 Moze (disambiguation)